Vacca also known as Vaccaman, Mr. Vacca, Lil' Mocho or Devil The Rasta (born Alessandro Vacca on 21 October 1979) is an Italian rapper who lives in Kingston.

Career
Vacca was born in Cagliari but he grew up in Milan in the neighborhood of Quarto Oggiaro. The press coverage, mostly in Italian, presents him as a "redeemed" person, who has fought against drug addiction, poverty, and degradation for the sake of his newly created family. 
From 2001 to 2003, Vacca played with a group called Azhilo Nitro. After this first experience he published the EP Mr. Cartoon, in 2003. Deeply influenced by Jamaican music, he combined rap and reggae  in his solo debut album, titled VH, published in May 2004. His music shows evident musical influences of the Casabrasa, a collective of DJs with whom he performed live, featuring electronic instrumentals, and the voice in rap style is consequently brought to marry dancehall and reggae. In 2010 he moved to Kingston, Jamaica, where he lives with his partner, after the birth of his daughter Zuri.

Discography

Albums
 2004: VH
 2007: Faccio quello che voglio
 2010: Sporco
 2011: Pelleossa
 2012: Pazienza
 2015: L'ultimo tango
 2019: Don Vacca Corleone

EP
 2003: Mr. Cartoon
 2009: Non prima delle 6:10
 2010: Lost In Mi-Nord

Singles
 2006: Chi sbaglia paga

Mixtape
 2008: Poco di buono
 2009: Don't Say Nothing 1
 2009: Don't Say Nothing 2
 2011: Get maad

Collaborations

 2003: Vacca ft. Esa - Quartieri
 2003: Nonzeta ft. Vacca - Stile
 2006: Federica Felini ft. Vacca - Non Fidarti
 2006: Golden Bass Ft. Vacca - Golden Dub
 2007: Pesi Piuma (HegoKid & Mars) Ft. Vacca - Scatti Quotidiani
 2007: Vacca ft. Nesli - Non mi butto giù (FOBC)
 2007: Vacca ft. Nesli - Il verdetto (FOBC)
 2007: Vacca ft. Nesli - Spara (FOBC)
 2007: Vacca ft. Nesli - Tu che ne sai (FOBC)
 2008: Numeri 2 Ft. Vacca - Occhio Alla Bomba
 2008: Numeri 2 Ft. Vacca - Come Noi... Come No!
 2009: Gabo Ft. Vacca - Pesante
 2009: Entics Ft. Denny e Vacca - Bla Bla
 2009: Vacca Ft. Daniele Vit - Cartoni & Pop Corn
 2009: Karkadan Ft. Vacca - Cool Yourm
 2009: Vacca Ft. Zi Funk - Devi Darla
 2009: Vacca Ft. Aumrec- Divani
 2009: Vacca Ft. Daniele Vit - Dna
 2009: Vacca & Lil Wayne + Dvus - Fearless
 2009: Vacca Ft. Pie - Infinito Monitor
 2009: Vacca Ft. Electrofants - Italian Do It Best
 2009: Vacca Ft. Funkyman & Dj Valerio - Xmas Remix
 2009: Vacca Ft. Daniele Vit - Non So Come Si Fà
 2009: Club Dogo Ft. Vacca, Noyz Narcos & Nex Cassel - Sgrilla Remix
 2009: Vacca Ft. G Nano & Green Peeps - Stanco Morto
 2009: Vacca Ft. Nacho - Vieni Qua
 2009: Guè pequeno Ft. Vacca & Daniele vit - Voglio lei
 2009: Bassi maestro Ft. Babaman & Vacca - Se morissi lunedì
 2009: Two Fingerz Ft. Vacca - ''Cioccolato
 2009: Vacca Ft. Emis Killa - xxxmas
 2010: Vacca Ft. Emis Killa - Mi Prendo Tutto Quanto
 2010: Ensi Ft. Vacca, Daniele vit, Surfa, Raige, Amir & Dan-t - 2010
 2010: Big Fish Ft. Vacca & Ensi - Generazione Tuning
 2010: Vacca Ft. Kuanito, JT & Dinamite - Veleno
 2010: Giuann Shadai Ft. Vacca - Uomo macchina
 2010: Vacca Ft. Nacho - Chi Sei Tu?
 2010: Fra Jamb Ft. Vacca - Allievi
 2010: Surfa Ft. Vacca - Non Fa Per Te
 2010: Darme Ft. Vacca & B.Bro - Hip Hop Marley
 2010: Surfa Ft. Vacca - My Mai
 2010: G Soave Ft. Vacca - Freshhh
 2010: Supa Ft. Vacca & Entics - Featuring
 2010: Vacca Ft. Nacho - 40 Gradi
 2010: Vacca Ft. B Bro - Pippo Sei Tu?
 2010: Vacca Ft. Savage - One More Chance
 2010: Vacca Ft. Mattaman - Non Chiedere Di Me
 2010: Club Dogo Ft. Vacca, Ensi, Entics & Emis Killa - Spacchiamo Tutto (Remix)
 2010: Emis Killa Ft Vacca - I'M The Shit
 2010: Jimmy X Ft Vacca - Ricche Sfondate
 2010: Exo Ft Jake La Furia Ft Emis Killa Ft Daniele Vit Ft Ensi Ft Luchè Ft Surfa Ft Vacca - Fino Alla Fine
 2010: Gordo Ft Vacca + G.Nano + Melo + Surfa + D-Strutto + Emis Killa + Denny Lahome + Ensi - Pettinaci (RMX)
 2010: Vacca Ft Daniele Vit - Voglio Farlo Con Te
 2011: Sonny PrimoGenito Ft Vacca - Buono A Nulla
 2011: Vacca + Savage - Over & Over
 2011: Vacca + Divoice - Buss A Gun
 2011: Sody feat. Vacca - Tanto (Tanto)
 2011: EnMiCasa Feat. Vacca - Lacrime E Sorrisi
 2011: Guè Pequeno feat. Zuli, Emis Killa & Vacca - XXX Pt. 2 (Hardcore)
 2011: Funky Gigolò feat Vacca - Ragazzacci
 2011: Don Joe & Dj Shablo feat. Vacca, Jhonny Marsiglia & Aban - Io Non Mi Fido Di Questo Sistema
 2011: Vacca feat. G.Nano - Volare
 2011: Ufo feat. Vacca & Reverendo - Fratelli Dispersi
 2011: Federico Chaves Feat. Vacca - Sola
 2011: Vacca Feat. Surfa - Universo
 2011: Vacca feat. Baby-k - Free
 2011: Vacca feat. J.Simms - Fuck off
 2011: Vacca Feat. J Simms - Till Di End Of Time
 2011: Jack The Smoker Feat. Vacca & Egreen - Conto Alla Rovescia
 2011: Incompatibili Feat. Vacca - Quello Che Mi Và
 2011: Ludax Feat Vacca & Matt Pawana - Italia
 2012: Gotik Feat Vacca & Surfa - Solo
 2012: Vacca Feat Ntò - Kill Dem All

References

Italian rappers
1979 births
Living people
Italian emigrants to Jamaica
Jamaican rappers